Malaysia competed in the 2005 Southeast Asian Games held in multiple venues in the Philippines from 27 November to 5 December 2005. The Chief of mission to the games was Low Beng Choo. At the opening ceremony, The three flagbearers, Ho Ro Bin, S. Ravichandran, Nabihah Ali represents the country's three major ethnic groups, Malay, Chinese and Indian.

Medal summary

Medals by sport

Medallists

Aquatics

Diving

Men

Women

Swimming

Men

Women

Football

Men's tournament
Group A

Semifinal

Bronze medal match

References

2005
Nations at the 2005 Southeast Asian Games